Mohammed Al Hadhoud (born 1 January 1985) is a Kuwaiti footballer. He currently plays as a midfielder for the Kuwaiti Premier League club Kazma.

References

1985 births
Living people
Kuwaiti footballers
Sportspeople from Kuwait City
Association football midfielders
Kuwait international footballers
Al Salmiya SC players
Kazma SC players
Al-Nasr SC (Kuwait) players
Kuwait Premier League players